"Roses of Red" is a song by European-American pop group The Kelly Family. Written and lead sung by band member Maite Kelly, it was produced by her sister Kathy Kelly and Hartmut Pfannmüller for their eighth regular studio album Over the Hump (1994). The song was released as the album's third single. The ballad reached the top twenty of the German Singles Chart.

Track listings

Credits and personnel 
Credits adapted from the liner notes of Over the Hump.

Songwriting – The Kelly Family
Production – Hartmut Pfannmüller, Kathy Kelly
Executive production – Dan Kelly, Mike Ungefehr
Engineering – Günther Kasper

Charts

Weekly charts

Year-end charts

References

External links
 KellyFamily.de — official site

1995 songs
The Kelly Family songs